The Latimer Arts College (formerly Latimer Community Arts College) is a foundation secondary school and specialist arts college located in Barton Seagrave, Northamptonshire, England, teaching students aged 11 to 18. The school has approximately 1020 students. The most recent Ofsted inspection from February 2018 judged Latimer as remaining Good.

The school is also home to The Masque Theatre which is used by both the school and the community, and includes a recording studio and conference and meeting rooms.

References 

Secondary schools in North Northamptonshire
Foundation schools in North Northamptonshire
Specialist arts colleges in England